Ihab amir is a Moroccan singer, songwriter, composer and actor. Born 14 May 1994 in Safi, Morocco, he rose to popularity as a contestant in the 11th season of Star Academy Arab World. He made his commercial singing debut with two songs, "Nta li Bditi" and "Taali Lia", in July 2015.

Star Academy 11

Amir competed in the 11th season of Star Academy Arab World. He was the second Moroccan male ever to be accepted on to the show. Ihab won people's hearts from the get go, mainly due to his pride in showcasing the Moroccan dialect with the other candidates ,his decent character and his multi-talent. Amir was never named by any of the show's judges for nomination up until the week of his exit when he was finally named a nominee. Amir was nominated only once on the show. During this nomination he was shown to have lost the public vote, which raised allegations that the show tampered with the results. Fans of Amir expressed their outrage through social media 1 January 2016.

Performances in Star Academy 11
 1st Prime : Ibaat li Gawab – Sabah Fakhri
 2nd Prime : Nawiha – Mohamed Hamaki
 3rd Prime : Mal Habibi malo  – Saad Lamjarred
 4th Prime : Lemen Nechki Hali – Saad Lamjarred
 5th Prime : Min ghir lih – Mohammed Abdel Wahab
 6th Prime : Houbi al anani – Marwan Khoury
 7th Prime : We marret el ayam – Umm Kulthum
 8th Prime : Abdel kader – khaled
 9th Prime : Ya zahratan fi khayali _ Farid al-Atrash
 10th Prime : Baathe lak ya Habib roh – Fairuz
 11th Prime : babouri rayh rayh – Ilham al-Madfai
 12th Prime : Ana Benseheb – Wael Jassar
 16th Prime (The final) : Enty Saad Lamjarred

Return to Morocco
After Ihab Amir's exclusion from the show, his fans were ready to welcome him in the airport of Casablanca. though it was a shock for all the Moroccans and the Arabs to see this huge number of fans in the airport for a candidate that was excluded from the show on his first nomination. On his arrival to Morocco the fans made him a huge welcoming not only in the airport but also in his city Safi that lasted for a whole day and all the fans from other countries watched it from his Periscope, it was the talk of the press in the whole Arab world. Due to this fame that was acquired in a very short time many Radio and TV channels invited Ihab for interviews such as Hit Radio, Chada FM, 2M and Medi 1 TV the latter made a report about his debut.

His career after the academy
Awards

 MEMA encouragement award (2016)
 Dear guest best rising singer (2016)
 Happa african award best youth singer north africa (2017)
 Morocco music awards (2017)
 Afrimma best singer north africa (2018)
 Arabsat festival best youth arab singer (2019)
 Casa arts best moroccan youth singer (2020)
 Arabsat festival best youth arab singer (2020)
Arabsat festival best youth arab singer (2021)

Discography 

other

Nedmana-dunia batma(2019)/composer and songwriter

"Al atfal naema operet"(2019)/participation as a singer

Acting career

Badr in tv series"ser kedim" (2021)

References

External links 
 
 
 

Living people
Year of birth missing (living people)
Moroccan songwriters
People from Safi, Morocco